Hackelia velutina is a species of flowering plant in the borage family known by the common name velvet stickseed.

Distribution
It is endemic to California, growing in the Sierra Nevada in red fir and lodgepole pine forest habitats.

Description
Hackelia velutina is a lush, hairy perennial herb reaching a maximum height between 40 and 80 centimeters. Most of the lance-shaped leaves are located around the base of the erect stems, the longest to about 17 centimeters.

Atop the stems are cyme inflorescences of bright blue to lavender flowers. Each small tubular flower has five lobes with a petallike appendage at the base of each.

The fruit is a nutlet covered in long prickles.

External links
Calflora Database: Hackelia velutina (Velvet stickseed)
Jepson Manual eFlora (TJM2) treatment of Hackelia velutina

velutina
Endemic flora of California
Flora of the Sierra Nevada (United States)
Flora without expected TNC conservation status